D. Purushothaman was an Indian politician and former Member of the Legislative Assembly of Tamil Nadu. He was elected to the Tamil Nadu legislative assembly from Saidapet constituency as a Dravida Munnetra Kazhagam candidate in 1977, and 1980 elections.

References 

Members of the Tamil Nadu Legislative Assembly
Dravida Munnetra Kazhagam politicians
Living people
Year of birth missing (living people)